Grace Ciao is a fashion illustrator from Singapore.

Early life 
Ciao was born in Singapore.

Education 
Ciao graduated with a degree in business from National University of Singapore.

Career 
Ciao is known for her illustrations using real flower petals and watercolor painting.

Ciao grew up developing an interest in fashion, trying to recreate the designs she saw on TV and in magazines. She began using petals for illustration after wanting to preserve a red rose that was given to her. Her designs are mainly dresses, using natural form of each flower on her illustrations, so each piece has an element of realism as well as fantasy. She has created illustrations for companies such as Chanel, Christian Dior, and Fendi.

References

External links 
 Grace Ciao official website

Year of birth missing (living people)
Living people
National University of Singapore alumni
Fashion illustrators
Watercolorists
Singaporean women illustrators
Women watercolorists